The Liujia Line is a branch line of the Taiwan Railway Administration (TRA) Western Line. It is located in Hsinchu County, Taiwan. It was built to link the Western Line to the THSR's Hsinchu Station, speeding up transit times between the two forms of rail service and, by extension, downtown Hsinchu City. The opening of the line experienced slight delays and eventually opened in November 2011.

Stations

References

External links

 Railway Reconstruction Bureau project page (in Chinese)

3 ft 6 in gauge railways in Taiwan
TRA routes